Vladimír Petlák (21 February 1946 – 2 February 1999) was a Czech volleyball player who competed for Czechoslovakia in the 1968 Summer Olympics, in the 1972 Summer Olympics, and in the 1976 Summer Olympics.

He was born in Kuřim and died in Ústí nad Labem.

In 1968 he was part of the Czechoslovak team which won the bronze medal in the Olympic tournament. He played all nine matches.

Four years later he finished sixth with the Czechoslovak team in the 1972 Olympic tournament. He played all seven matches.

At the 1976 Games he was a member of the Czechoslovak team which finished fifth in the Olympic tournament. He played all six matches.

External links
 profile

1946 births
1999 deaths
People from Kuřim
Czech men's volleyball players
Czechoslovak men's volleyball players
Olympic volleyball players of Czechoslovakia
Volleyball players at the 1968 Summer Olympics
Volleyball players at the 1972 Summer Olympics
Volleyball players at the 1976 Summer Olympics
Olympic bronze medalists for Czechoslovakia
Olympic medalists in volleyball
Medalists at the 1968 Summer Olympics
Sportspeople from the South Moravian Region